is a martial arts manga written and illustrated by Jyutaroh Nishino. CMX has released an English version of the manga in the United States, Canada and the United Kingdom.

Plot
Steel Fist Riku is set in an otherwise similar world where humans co-exist with half-human animals. A small village where Iwao Rokuhara, once a promising fighter, works in a movie photo store
with an orphan girl which he took in and gave the name Riku, making her his pupil and (more or less) adopted daughter. Riku was born with the ability to make her left fist become steel.

Reception
Carlo Santos, a columnist for the Anime News Network, gava a positive review to Steel Fist Riku. He found the manga surprisingly fun to read with "snappy action scenes, sprightly humor, and amusing characters".

References

External links
Steel Fist Riku at Flex Comix 
Steel Fist Riku at Yahoo! Comics 
Steel Fist Riku at DC Comics

2006 manga
CMX (comics) titles
Fantasy anime and manga
FlexComix Blood and FlexComix Next manga
Japanese webcomics
Martial arts anime and manga
Shōnen manga
Webcomics in print